The European Federation of Periodontology (EFP) is a non-profit organisation dedicated to promoting awareness of periodontal science, the science and clinical practice of periodontics and implant dentistry, and the importance of gum health. Its guiding vision is “Periodontal health for a better life.”

Founded in 1991, the EFP is a federation of 37 national periodontal societies and represents more than 16,000 periodontists, dentists, researchers, and oral-health professionals in Europe and around the world. It pursues evidence-based science in periodontal and oral health, promoting events and campaigns aimed at dental and medical professionals as well as the public.

The EFP organises EuroPerio, a triennial congress in periodontology and implant dentistry – the largest European conference on periodontology whose most recent edition was attended by more than 10,000 people – as well as events for clinicians and researchers such as Perio Master Clinic and Perio Workshop. Together with its member societies, the EFP organizes the annual Gum Health Day on 12 May, an awareness-raising initiative that has sought to bring key messages on gum health to millions of people across the world. It has also run a series of public-health campaigns on the links between periodontal and general health.

The EFP’s Journal of Clinical Periodontology, published monthly, is a leading scientific publication and has the highest impact factor of journals in dentistry, oral surgery, and medicine. The federation also publishes a monthly digest of research (JCP Digest) in seven languages, as well as two issues per year of the magazines Perio Insight and Perio Life. 

The EFP plays an important role in education through its accredited programme for postgraduate education in periodontology and implant dentistry which is taught at 16 universities. It has also been campaigning, along with its member societies, for European Union recognition of periodontology as a speciality within dentistry.

Strategic vision and goals 
The EFP’s strategic vision is “periodontal health for a better life,” which emphasises the interaction between periodontal health and overall health and the positive role that periodontology can play in public health. The federation seeks to serve both the professional periodontal and dentistry sector as well as patients and the public.Periodontology encompasses the art, science, and practice of attaining and maintaining healthy tissues supporting and surrounding teeth or their substitutes, replacing lost teeth by implantation of natural and/or synthetic devices, and reconstructing lost supporting structures by regeneration or repair with the goal of maintaining health, function and aesthetics to improve oral and general health and wellbeing.

In seeking to fulfil its strategic vision, the EFP has four strategic objectives:

1.      Improved health and wellbeing:  Improve and promote periodontal health globally as part of oral and general health and wellbeing, ensuring social and economic inclusion, by working in partnership with patients, governments, professional bodies, industry, consumer groups, and other organisations. 

2.      Education and training: Maintain, refine, harmonise, and further develop the highest standards of education and training in the art, science, and practice of periodontology and implant dentistry to increase knowledge/awareness on the importance of periodontal diseases and their consequences for other oral and non-oral health professionals. 

3.      Policy and influence: In collaboration with national member organizations and through strong leadership, influence policy at national and international levels, including the recognition of periodontal diseases as a public-health problem as well as source and consequence of social inequality. The recognition of periodontology as a dental speciality in the EU is fundamental prerequisite. 

4.      Science and research: Promote research and knowledge-basis in all aspects of periodontology and implant dentistry, with global dissemination and application of research findings to enhance patient and public awareness and promote the practice of evidence-based and patient-centred care and, in turn, clinical outcomes. 

As set out in the federation’s by-laws: The EFP is a non-profit making organization whose goal is the promotion, by all means at its disposal, of periodontology and, more generally, oral health both in Europe and worldwide. In particular: 

 To promote the development and practice of periodontology and of oral health in Europe and to ensure the development and recognition of the specialty of periodontology in Europe. 
 To ensure a high level of knowledge in these disciplines by publications, collaborative scientific research and by any other means at its disposal.
 To oversee the dissemination of research and publications by its members and other research workers.
 To ensure the independence and the integrity of the profession of periodontology and/or dentists with a specific interest in periodontology

In addition, the EFP also has a goal to promote and represent the interests of the discipline of periodontology in Europe and worldwide.

History of the EFP 
The origins of the European Federation of Periodontology (EFP) date back to a conversation in 1985 between Dr Jean-Louis Giovannoli (France) and Professor Ubele van der Velden (the Netherlands). The concept of a united and cooperative body of European societies of periodontology emerged from this conversation. Subsequent discussions and meetings, over the following six years, led to the formation of the Federation. 

The European Federation of Periodontology was formally created at a meeting on 12–13 December 1991 in Amsterdam at which the federation’s objectives were adopted and its constitution and by-Laws were approved. The newly formed EFP comprised the national societies of periodontology of 11 European countries: the Belgian, British, Dutch, French, German, Irish, Italian, Portuguese, Spanish, Swedish, and Swiss societies.

The EFP’s constitution and by-Laws were amended in 1996, 2010, and 2016.

The EFP’s first scientific congress, called EuroPerio1, was held at EuroDisney in Paris, France, on 12–15 May 1994.   Since then, a further eight editions of the EuroPerio congress have been held.

The first European Workshop on Periodontology (later rebranded as Perio Workshop) was held in February 1993 in Ittingen Charterhouse, Thurgau, Switzerland, focused on “the clinical practice of periodontology”. A further 15 such workshops have since been held, some in partnership with other organisations.

In 1998, the EFP gave its first accreditation to a postgraduate programme in periodontology, to the Academic Centre of Dentistry (ACTA) in Amsterdam, the Netherlands, followed by the University of Bern in Switzerland. By 2021, the number of accredited programmes stood at 16 in 12 countries.

The EFP’s flagship publication is the Journal of Clinical Periodontology which has been published since 1974 and which became the official journal of the federation in December 1993. The publisher of the Journal since 2008 has been Wiley Online Library.

The EFP organises, with its national-society members, an annual periodontal-health awareness day held on May 12. Launched in 2014 as the European Day of Periodontology, this awareness day subsequently evolved into Gum Health Day, which aims to be a global event that raises the visibility of periodontology and gum health among the public.

Since 2017, the EFP has run a series of workshops and awareness campaigns in conjunction with its commercial partners. The first of these focused on oral health and pregnancy and subsequent campaigns have covered the links between periodontal disease and caries, diabetes, and cardiovascular disease.

In November 2017, the EFP and the American Academy of Periodontology (AAP) joined forces at the World Workshop on Periodontal and Peri-implant Diseases and Conditions in Chicago, USA, to draw up a new classification of periodontal and peri-implant diseases and conditions. Subsequently, the EFP has encouraged clinicians to adopt the new classification and created an S3-level clinical practice guideline on the treatment of periodontitis in accordance with the new classification. 

At its general assembly in October 2020, the EFP launched its Sustainability Manifesto, which commits the federation to ensuring that sustainability is at the heart of all its activities.

In May 2020, in response to the SARS-Cov-2 pandemic, the EFP published a Covid-19 safety protocol for dental practices.

Purpose of the EFP

The prime purpose of the EFP is the promotion of periodontology and, more generally, periodontal and general health both in Europe and worldwide by means of research, education and further development of its science.

EFP member societies
The EFP has three categories of membership: full members, associate members, and international associate members. New members are accepted at the federation’s annual general assembly, usually held in March or April. As of March 2021, the EFP had 37 member societies (26 full members, four associate members, seven international associate members).

Full members: Austrian Society of Periodontology, Belgian Society of Periodontology, British Society of Periodontology and Implant Dentistry, Croatian Society of Periodontology, Czech Society of Periodontology, Danish Society of Periodontology, Dutch Society of Periodontology, Finnish Society of Periodontology, French Society of Periodontology and Oral Implantology, German Society of Periodontology, Hellenic Society of Periodontology and Implant Dentistry, Hungarian Society of Periodontology, Irish Society of Periodontology, Israeli Society of Periodontology and Osseointegration, Italian Society of Periodontology and Implantology, Lithuanian Association of Periodontology, Norwegian Society of Periodontology, Polish Society of Periodontology, Portuguese Society of Periodontology and Implantology, Romanian Society of Periodontology, Serbian Society of Periodontology, Slovenian Society of Periodontology, Spanish Society of Periodontology and Osseointegration, Swedish Society of Periodontology and Implantology, Swiss Society of Periodontology, Turkish Society of Periodontology.

Associate members: Azerbaijani Society of Periodontology, Georgian Association of Periodontology, Moroccan Society of Periodontology and Implantology, Russian Society of Periodontology.

International associate members: Argentinian Society of Periodontology, Australian Society of Periodontology, Brazilian Society of Periodontology, Lebanese Society of Periodontology, Mexican Association of Periodontology, Society of Periodontology Singapore.

EuroPerio congress 

The triennial EuroPerio congress is the most important event organised by the EFP and one of the world’s biggest meetings in the field of periodontology (dentistry). The most recent edition – EuroPerio9 in Amsterdam (2018) – attracted more than 10,000 attendees from 111 countries and featured 134 scientific presentations.

Since EuroPerio1 in 1994, a total of nine editions of the EuroPerio congress have been held.  EuroPerio10 was due to be held in June 2021 but because of the SARS-CoV-2 pandemic was postponed until June 2022. Each EuroPerio congress is organised by an organising committee that is selected at a general assembly of the EFP. Each organising committee comprises a chair, a scientific chair, and a treasurer as well as other members including representatives of the EFP-affiliated society in the country that hosts the congress. Since EuroPerio7 in Vienna in 2012, the EFP has used the services of professional conference organiser Mondial Congress & Events to help organise the EuroPerio congresses.

The full list of EuroPerio congresses, with their chairs and scientific chairs is:

 EuroPerio1: Paris, France, 12-15 May 1994. Chair: Jean-Louis Giovannoli. Scientific chair: Pierre Baehni.
 EuroPerio2: Florence, Italy, 15-17 May 1997. Chair: Massimo de Sanctis. Scientific chair: Mariano Sanz.
 EuroPerio3: Geneva, Switzerland, 8-11 June 2000. Chair: Pierre Baehni. Scientific chair: Ubele van der Velden.
 EuroPerio4: Berlin, Germany, 19-21 June 2003. Chair: Jörg Meyle. Scientific chair: Maurizio Tonetti.
 EuroPerio5: Madrid, Spain, 29 June-1 July 2006. Chair: Mariano Sanz. Scientific chair: Stefan Renvert.
 EuroPerio 6: Stockholm, Sweden, 4-6 June 2009. Chair: Stefan Renvert. Scientific chair: Pierpaolo Cortellini.
 EuroPerio 7: Vienna, Austria, 6-9 June 2012. Chair: Gernot Wimmer. Scientific chair: Richard Palmer.
 EuroPerio8: London, UK, 3-8 June 2015. Chair: Francis Hughes. Scientific chair: Mariano Sanz.
 EuroPerio9: Amsterdam, Netherlands, 20-23 June. Chair: Michèle Reners. Scientific chair: Søren Jepsen.

EuroPerio10 is due to take place in Copenhagen, Denmark, 15-18 June 2022. Chair: Phoebus Madianos. Scientific chair: David Herrera.

Perio Workshop (European Workshop on Periodontology)
Perio Workshop (originally called the European Workshop on Periodontology) is a scientific meeting in which a group of international experts discuss the latest evidence on topics of relevance to periodontology and implant dentistry and draw up an evidence-based consensus. The findings of each workshop have been published, initially by Quintessence International and, since 2002 as special open-access monographic supplements of the Journal of Clinical Periodontology.

Since the first European Workshop on Periodontology was held in 1993, a total of 16 workshops have taken place. The first six workshops were held in Ittingen Charterhouse, Thurgau, Switzerland and were chaired by Nikaus Lang. Since 2009, the workshops have taken place at La Granja de San Ildefonso, Segovia, Spain, chaired by Mariano Sanz (2009-2019). Workshops from 2021 are chaired by David Herrera. The 2017 workshop was held in Chicago, USA.

The workshops of 2012 and 2017 were “world workshops”, jointly organised by the EFP and the American Academy of Periodontology (AAP). Several other workshops were held in collaboration with other dental and medical organisations.

The 16 editions of Perio Workshop/European Workshop on Periodontology have covered a wide range of topics in periodontology and implant dentistry:

 1993: Clinical practice of periodontology. 
 1996: Chemicals in periodontics. 
 1999: Implant dentistry.
 2002: Periodontal practice. 
 2005: Aetiology and pathogenesis leading to preventive concepts. 
 2008: Contemporary periodontics.
 2009: EFP-ADEE (European Association of Dental Education). Periodontal education.
 2010: The biology of periodontal and peri-implant diseases.
 2011: Quality of reporting of experimental research in implant dentistry. 
 2012: EFP-AAP (American Academy of Periodontology). Periodontitis and systemic diseases.
 2013: Periodontal plastic surgery and soft-tissue regeneration. 
 2014: Effective prevention of periodontal and peri-implant diseases.
 2016: EFP-ORCA (European Organisation for Caries Research). Boundaries between caries and periodontal diseases. 
 2017: EFP-APP. World Workshop on the Classification of periodontal and peri-implant diseases and conditions. 
 2018: EFP-Osteology Foundation. Bone regeneration. 
 2019: Evidence-based guideline for management of stages I-III periodontitis. 
 2021: Evidence-based guideline for management of stage IV periodontitis.

Perio Master Clinic 
Perio Master Clinic is an EFP-organised meeting focused on periodontal clinicians' training and expertise. It was created to “bridge the gap” between the triennial EuroPerio congresses and offers a more intimate environment, with hands-on training by leading clinical practitioners of periodontology and implant dentistry.

Four editions of Perio Master Clinic have taken place:

 Perio Master Clinic 2014: Paris. Theme: Peri-implant plastic and reconstructive surgery (Chair: Jean-Louis Giovannoli, Scientific Chair: PierPaolo  Cortellini ).
 Perio Master Clinic 2017: Valletta, Malta. Theme: Peri-implantitis: from aetiology to treatment (Chair: Korkud Demirel, Scientific Chair: Stefan Renvert).
 Perio Master Clinic 2019: Hong Kong. Theme: Peri-implantitis: prevention and treatment of soft- and hard-tissue defects (Chairs: Maurizio Tonetti and Stanley Lai, Scientific Chair: Stefan Renvert).
 Perio Master Clinic 2020: Dublin, Ireland. Theme: “Hard- and soft-tissue aesthetic reconstructions around teeth and implants – current and future challenges.” (Chair: Declan Corcoran, Scientific Chair: Anton Sculean).

Perio Master Clinic 2022 is due to take place in León, Mexico. Theme: “Hard- and soft-tissue aesthetic reconstructions around teeth and implants – current and future challenges.”  (Chair: Alejandro Garcia, Scientific Chair: Anton Sculean

Perio Master Clinic 2023 is due to take place in Antwerp, Belgium. Theme: Perio-Ortho Surgery (Chair: Peter Garmyn, Scientific Chair: Virginie Monnet-Corti).

New classification and evidence-based guidelines on periodontal and peri-implant diseases 
At the World Workshop on the Classification of Periodontal and Peri-implant Diseases and Conditions, held in Chicago in November 2017, the EFP and the American Academy of Periodontology (AAP) drew up a new classification of periodontal and peri-implant diseases and conditions after reviewing the scientific evidence and creating a consensus knowledge base. This new classification updated the previous classification of 1999. The World Workshop’s research papers and consensus reports were published simultaneously in June 2018 in the EFP’s Journal of Clinical Periodontology and the AAP’s Journal of Periodontology. The new classification was presented formally by the two organisations at the EuroPerio9 congress in Amsterdam on 22 June 2018.

To assist clinicians in implementing the new classification, the EFP published a toolkit in April 2019, comprising a set of guidance notes, slide presentations, infographics, and videos. 

At Perio Workshop 2019, the process of drawing up a formal S3-level clinical practice guideline for the treatment of periodontitis stages I-III was started. This guideline was published in July 2020 in a special supplement of the Journal of Clinical Periodontology. 

This guideline approaches the treatment of periodontitis (stages I, II and III) using a pre-established stepwise approach to therapy that, depending on the disease stage, should be incremental, each including different interventions. Consensus was achieved on recommendations covering different interventions, aimed at:

(a) behavioural changes, supragingival biofilm, gingival inflammation, and risk factor control. 

(b) supra- and sub-gingival instrumentation, with and without adjunctive therapies.

(c) different types of periodontal surgical interventions.

(d) the necessary supportive periodontal care to extend benefits over time.

This S3 guideline informs clinical practice, health systems, policymakers and, indirectly, the public on the available and most effective modalities to treat periodontitis and to maintain a healthy dentition for a lifetime, according to the available evidence at the time of publication.

Gum Health Day 

The EFP organises, together with its affiliated national societies of periodontology, an annual periodontal-health awareness day held on May 12. Launched in 2014 as the European Day of Periodontology, this awareness day subsequently evolved into Gum Health Day, which aims to be a global event that raises the visibility of periodontology and gum health among the public. Each year a different topic and slogan is chosen, and outreach events and media activities are carried out in many countries. The following awareness days have been organised:

 European Day of Periodontology 2014. Slogan: “Association between periodontal diseases and systemic conditions.”
 European Periodontology Day 2015. Slogan: “Gum health links with oral and general health.”
 European Periodontology Day 2016. Slogan: “Healthy gums for a better life.”
 European Gum Heath Day 2017. Slogan: “Fighting periodontal disease together.”
 European Gum Health Day 2018. Slogan: “Health begins with healthy gums.”
 Gum Health Day 2019. Slogan: “Healthy gums, beautiful smile.”
 Gum Health Day 2020. Slogan: “Say no to bleeding gums.”
 Gum Health Day 2021. Slogan: “Gum diseases are preventable.”

The EFP's role in education 
Education has been fundamental to the EFP’s mission since the federation’s inception. At a meeting in May 1990 in Maastricht, the Netherlands, where the constitution and rules of procedure of what would the following year become the EFP were proposed, among the aims of the new organisation were:“To promote equal and high standards in the countries of the member societies in the areas of […]

 Undergraduate periodontal education by deciding on the minimal requirements of a periodontal training programme for recognition by the EFP.
 Graduate periodontal education by deciding on the minimal requirements for a periodontal specialisation programme for recognition by the EFP and a periodontal training centre to be recognised by the EFP as a qualified training centre.”In 1998, the EFP gave its first accreditation to a postgraduate programme in periodontology, to the Academic Centre of Dentistry (ACTA) in Amsterdam, the Netherlands, followed later in that year by the University of Bern in Switzerland. In 2021, there were 16 universities in 12 countries teaching EFP-accredited programmes in periodontology:

 KU Leuven, Belgium.
 University of Liège, Belgium.
 Paris Diderot University, Paris, France.
 University of Strasbourg, France.
 University of Hong Kong, Hong Kong.
 Trinity College, Dublin, Ireland.
 Rambam Health Care Campus, Haifa, Israel.
 Hebrew University Medical Centre, Jerusalem, Israel.
 University of Turin, Italy.
 Academic Centre of Dentistry Amsterdam (ACTA), the Netherlands.
 International University of Catalonia (UIC), Barcelona, Spain.
 Complutense University of Madrid, Spain.
 Sahlgrenska Academy, University of Gothenburg, Sweden.
 University of Bern, Switzerland.
 Yeditepe University, Turkey.
 UCL Eastman Dental Institute, London, United Kingdom.

The EFP organises a biennial Postgraduate Symposium involving second- and third-year students of the programmes, together with the programme directors and co-ordinators. The symposium provides opportunities for the postgraduate students to present their clinical or research work. It is also intended to encourage networking between students of the various EFP-accredited programmes. Each symposium is organised by a different programme. Eight symposia have been held in Switzerland (2005), the Netherlands (2007), Turkey (2009), the United Kingdom (2011), Belgium (2013), Spain (2015), Ireland (2017), and Sweden (2019). The symposium due to be held in September 2021 in Belgium was postponed until September 2022.

In 2018, the EFP launched EFP Alumni, a community that represents periodontists who have received the EFP certificate after completing their accredited masters’ courses at one of the accredited programmes and members of the faculties that teach the courses. 

In terms of undergraduate education, the EFP issued the booklet “Curricular Guidelines in Undergraduate Education” in 1996, which was distributed to dental schools and periodontal departments in Europe, and to national societies of periodontology, the Association for Dental Education in Europe, and the American Academy of Periodontology. 

In 2016, the EFP conducted a survey of undergraduate education in periodontology to find out to what extent dental schools were meeting the objectives and learning outcomes as defined in Curricular Guidelines and to evaluate the preclinical and clinical work done by students during their undergraduate training. The survey found a huge diversity in the way periodontology was taught at the undergraduate level.

Also in 2016, the Journal of Clinical Periodontology published the EFP Delphi study on trends in periodontology and periodontics in Europe for the year 2025, which predicted an increase in the need for education in periodontology, especially at university level.

EFP publications
The EFP’s Journal of Clinical Periodontology, published monthly, is a leading scientific publication and has the highest impact factor of journals in dentistry, oral surgery, and medicine. Its impact factor for 2020 was 8.728.

Since April 2020, the Journal of Clinical Periodontology (JCP) has been edited by Panos N. Papapanou, who succeeded Maurizio S. Tonetti (2005-2020) and Jan Lindhe (1976-2004). The JCP became the official journal of the EFP in 1993. It was first published in 1974 and its first editor (1974-1976) was Hans Rudolf Mühlemann.The aim of the Journal of Clinical Periodontology is to provide a platform for the exchange of scientific and clinical progress in the field of periodontology and allied disciplines, and to do so at the highest possible level. The JCP also aims to facilitate the application of new scientific knowledge to the daily practice of the concerned disciplines and addresses both practicing clinicians and members of the academic community.

The Journal is the official publication of the European Federation of Periodontology but serves an international audience by publishing contributions of high scientific merit in the fields of periodontology and implant dentistry. The journal accepts a broad spectrum of original work characterised as clinical or preclinical, basic or translational, as well as authoritative reviews, and proceedings of important scientific workshops. The journal’s scope encompasses the physiology and pathology of the periodontal and peri-implant tissues, the biology and the modulation of periodontal and peri-implant tissue healing and regeneration, the diagnosis, aetiology, epidemiology, prevention and therapy of periodontal and peri-implant diseases and conditions, the association of periodontal infection/inflammation and general health, and the clinical aspects of comprehensive rehabilitation of the periodontitis-affected patient.

The EFP also publishes a monthly digest of research (JCP Digest) in seven languages. JCP Digest offers concise research in periodontology to enable clinicians to keep their knowledge up to date, summarising studies first published in the Journal of Clinical Periodontology. Edited by Phoebus Madianos and Andreas Stavropoulos (EFP scientific affairs committee), with the co-operation of the JCP editor-in-chief, each issue of the digest is prepared by a team of students at one of the EFP-accredited postgraduate periodontology courses. The publication is published first in English and then translated into Croatian, French, German, Italian, Portuguese, and Spanish.

In addition, the EFP publishes two issues per year of the magazines Perio Insight (launched 2016) which covers periodontal science and clinical practice with expert opinion and debate articles, and Perio Life (launched 2021), the magazine of EFP Alumni. The EFP also publishes Perio Review, an annual report on its activities and was launched in 2019 as a replacement for the twice-yearly bulletin EFP News. The editor of these EFP publications, from 2003, has been Joanna Kamma.

Other, one-off, publications by the EFP include:

 Time to take gum disease seriously: the societal and economic impact of periodontitis (2021), a report commissioned by the EFP from the Economist Intelligence Unit (EIU) which analyses in depth the financial and human cost of gum disease in six European countries.
 Dossier on Periodontal Disease (2020) which explains the causes, consequences, impact, and treatment of gingivitis, periodontitis, peri-implant mucositis, and peri-implantitis.
 Perio Focus (2017) a “green paper” on the impact of the global burden of periodontal diseases on the health, nutrition, and wellbeing of humankind.

Partners
The EFP’s work is supported by its partners, commercial companies involved in the periodontal and dental sector whether as consumer brands or as providers of equipment and materials to dental practitioners. Their support helps the EFP in performing its work of serving the development of periodontal science and clinical practice and the promotion of oral health. 

As of September 2021, the EFP’s partners were Dentaid, Oral-B, Curasept, Colgate, GSK, and the Straumann Group.The EFP also collaborates actively on specific projects with other sponsors and exhibitors, notably in the framework of the EuroPerio congresses.

According to the EFP’s institutional brochure, “the transparent collaboration between businesses and an informative non-profit-making scientific entity is a great asset for strengthening the links between science and commercial development, which greatly benefits professionals in periodontology, dentistry, and oral hygiene, as well as the general interest of the public.”

Campaigns 
Since 2017, the EFP has organised workshops and outreach campaigns with its partners focusing on specific areas of concern within periodontology. The materials produced by these campaigns are written by experts and based on the latest scientific evidence. Materials include scientific reports, recommendations, graphics, and videos. In some cases, dedicated workshops on the campaign topic were held first to review the evidence.

 Oral Health and Pregnancy (2017), sponsored by Oral-B.
 Perio & Diabetes (2018), sponsored by Sunstar, based on the findings of Perio-Diabetes Workshop (2017) organised by the EFP with the International Diabetes Federation, also sponsored by Sunstar.
 Perio & Caries (2018), sponsored by Colgate. Based on the findings of Perio Workshop 2016.
 Perio & Cardio (2020), sponsored by Dentaid. Based on the findings the Perio & Cardio Workshop (2019) organised by the EFP with the World Heart Federation, also sponsored by Dentaid.

EFP Virtual 
In April 2020, the EFP launched its first series of interactive webinars, called Perio Sessions, as a way to provide continuing education online. Perio Sessions features expert presentations on important scientific and clinical issues in periodontology and implant dentistry. Topics covered have included the EFP’s S3-level clinical practice guideline, periodontal surgery, and innovative techniques in periodontal and peri-implant therapy. In July 2020, the federation launched Perio Talks on Instagram, conversations between clinicians who also respond to questions from the live audience. These two initiatives were later brought under the umbrella brand of EFP Virtual. In September 2021, within EFP Virtual, the EFP launched the EuroPerio Series of online educational sessions related to the scientific programme of the forthcoming EuroPerio10 congress (Copenhagen, June 2022).

Prizes and awards 
The EFP awards two prizes: the Jaccard/EFP Prize for Periodontal Research, awarded every three years at the EuroPerio congress, and the annual Postgraduate Research Prize in EFP-accredited Postgraduate Programmes in Periodontology.

The EFP makes two annual awards: the EFP Distinguished Scientist Award and the EFP Distinguished Service award. Other awards, the EFP Eminence in Periodontology Award and the EFP International Eminence in Periodontology Award, are awarded on an occasional basis. The EFP Eminence in Periodontology award has been conferred on Ubele van der Velden (2014), Gianfranco Carnevale (2015), and Mariano Sanz (2021) and the International Eminence award to Bob Genco (2020).

Recognition of the speciality of periodontology 
In 2005 the European Directive on the Recognition of Professional Qualifications was approved. It was noted that periodontology was recognized as a speciality in 11 European Union member states. Since then, the EFP has been actively seeking recognition of periodontology as a speciality at the European level, starting with the publication in 2006 of the paper “Periodontology as a Recognized Dental Speciality in Europe” and continuing with the lobbying of European policymakers. The EFP believes that official recognition as a speciality frees periodontists from bureaucratic problems by enabling greater professional mobility and would also boost the exchange of knowledge, increase graduate applications, aid training, and increase access for patients.

At present, periodontology is recognised as a speciality in 11 of the 27 members of the EU: Belgium, Bulgaria, Croatia, Hungary, Latvia, Lithuania, Poland, Portugal, Slovenia, Sweden, and Romania. It is also recognized as a speciality in the UK, which left the EU in 2020. In several countries, there has been strong resistance to speciality recognition from dental associations, which are worried that the recognition of more dental specialties may limit the scope of practice for general dental practitioners. In September 2019, the question of the EU-wide recognition of periodontology as a speciality was discussed at a meeting of the EU Group of Co-ordinators (GoCs) for professional qualifications and freedom of movement.

The EFP on social media 
The EFP actively communicates via social media on the platforms Facebook (@efp.org), Instagram (@perioeurope), LinkedIn (The European Federation of Periodontology), Twitter (@perioeurope), and YouTube (EFP European Federation of Periodontology).

The EFP in the media 
Articles about the EFP, its work, and its campaigns have appeared in both the specialist and the general media in various countries. Such articles include:

"Why the health of your gums could save your life".The Times, February 16, 2021.  

"Time to take gum disease seriously: the societal and economic impact of periodontitis". The Economist, June 15, 2021. 

"Interview: 'Periodontics was never a static field'". Dental Tribune. May 4, 2021. 

"El israelí Lior Shapira, nuevo presidente de la Federación Europea de Periodoncia" (in Spanish). Gaceta Dental, April 5, 2021. 

On Covid-19: "Un estudio relaciona la salud de las encías con el riesgo de complicaciones por coronavirus" (in Spanish). El País, February 3, 2021.  "EFP devises SARS-CoV-2 safety protocol for dental patients and practices". Dental Tribune. May 11, 2020. "New EFP president on Covid-19: “Remain positive and safe”. Dental Tribune. April 6, 2020. "Coronavirus, senza dentista raddoppia il rischio di problemi alle gengive" (in Italian). La Repubblica. May 5, 2020.  "Los periodoncistas europeos sugieren un triaje telefónico antes de dar cita" (in Spanish). La Vanguardia. May 7, 2020. 

On Perio Workshop 2019: "Workshop yields new guideline for periodontitis treatment". Dentistry Today. December 12, 2019.  "Neue evidenzbasierte Leitlinie für die Parodontaltherapie" (in German). Quintessenz, December 5, 2019.

On Perio & Cardio campaign:  "Campaign highlights links between periodontal and cardiovascular diseases". Dental Tribune. September 22, 2020. "Parodontitis und Herz-Kreislauf-Erkrankungen" (in German). Dental Magazin. February 21, 2020. "Cardiologues et parodontistes : dialogue européen pour actualiser les connaissances" (in French). Information Dentaire. March 13, 2020.

On Perio Master Clinic 2020: "Interview: Prof. Anton Sculean on the Perio Master Clinic 2020". Dental Tribune. February 27, 2020. Neueste Erkenntnisse zum „Heiligen Gral“ der Zahnmedizin" (in German). Quintessenz. March 16, 2020.

On Gum Health Day: "Gum Health Day 2020 takes digital approach". Dental Tribune. May 12, 2020. "Gum Health Day 2021: promouvere la salute parodontale per una vita migliore" (in Italian). Odontoiatria33. May 11, 2021.

"Cuidado de los dientes: los minutos que debe durar tu cepillado para que sea efectivo" (in Spanish). ABC. September 9, 2020. 

"Gengive infiammate, sanguinamenti? La nostra dentatura è a rischio" (in Italian). Il Corriere della Sera. April 12, 2021. 

"Von 1991 bis 2021: EFP feiert 30-jähriges Bestehen"(in German). ZWP. March, 2021.

Structure of the EFP 
The EFP’s executive committee consists of the president, the president-elect, the two most recent past presidents, the secretary general, the treasurer, and two elected members. The president serves a one-year term, while the other committee members are elected for terms of three years.

The executive committee discusses all actions that should be taken by the EFP and prepares them for discussion and approval at the annual general assembly, which consists of representatives of the EFP-affiliated national societies of periodontology.

Seven committees have been formed to meet the needs of the objectives that EFP has set: the congress committee, European project committee, internal & external affairs committee, nominating committee, undergraduate education committee, postgraduate education committee, scientific affairs committee, workshop committee, and EFP Alumni. There are also committees for each edition of EuroPerio and Perio Master Clinic.

References

External links 
European Federation of Periodontology (EFP)
American Academy of Periodontology (AAP)
European Association of Osseointegration (EAO)
International Association for Dental Research (IADR)
Association for Dental Education in Europe (ADEE)
EuroPerio

Periodontology